The European Heritage Label is a recognition awarded by the European Union to buildings, documents, museums, archives, monuments or events which are seen as milestones in the creation of today's Europe. The program is managed by the European Commission.

History

Intergovernmental initiative

The European Heritage Label started as an intergovernmental initiative between 17 individual EU member states during a meeting in Granada, Spain on 28 April 2006. Motivations for creating the initiative included the 2005 referendums in France and the Netherlands, which resulted in the two countries not ratifying a constitution for Europe. The initiative's main aim was to identify and designate sites which have played a key role in building a united Europe and to see those sites through a European, rather than national, viewpoint.

The intergovernmental initiative connected both EU member states and non-member states such as Switzerland. The participating countries’ heritage agencies awarded the Label to sites with cross-border or pan-European character. The countries chose their own cultural assets, whether physical sites or more abstract traditions, meaning that the criteria for the Label varied per country. By 2010, 64 sites in 18 different participating countries had been awarded the intergovernmental label.

Transformation into an EU initiative 

On 20 November 2008, the Council adopted conclusions aimed at transforming the intergovernmental initiative into a Union action by inviting the Commission to submit to it a proposal for the creation by the Union of a European Heritage Label and to specify the practical procedures for the implementation of the project. Public hearings and impact assessments were carried out, confirming the added value of EU involvement. In 2010, the European Commission announced the plans for the EU-wide scheme known as the European Heritage Label and it was officially established on 16 November 2011.

European Heritage Label from 2013

Under the new Label, the first four sites were designated in 2013, with sixteen more designations following in 2014.

Candidate sites for the label must have a symbolic European value and must have played a significant role in the history and culture of Europe and/or the building of the Union. They must therefore demonstrate one or more of the following:

 their cross-border or pan-European nature: how their past and present influence and attraction go beyond the national borders of a Member State;
 their place and role in European history and European integration, and their links with key European events, personalities or movements;
 their place and role in the development and promotion of the common values that underpin European integration.

During the pre-selection stage, EU countries may choose up to two sites biennially, following which, at selection stage, a panel of 13 independent experts select and monitor the sites. The panel examines the applications and recommends to the European Commission which sites should be awarded the label on the basis of an established set of criteria. Candidate sites must also submit a work plan.

Participating countries

The following countries participate in the program:
 Austria
 Belgium
 Bulgaria
 Croatia
 Cyprus*
 Czech Republic
 Denmark
 Estonia
 France
 Germany
 Greece
 Hungary
 Italy
 Latvia
 Lithuania
 Luxembourg
 Malta
 Netherlands
 Poland
 Portugal
 Romania
 Slovakia
 Slovenia
 Spain

Selected sites

The sites currently holding the label are:

Austria

 Archaeological Park Carnuntum 
 The Imperial Palace Vienna, Vienna
 Werkbund Estates in Europe - Werkbundsiedlung Vienna

Belgium
 Mundaneum, Mons
 Bois du Cazier, Charleroi
 Colonies of Benevolence
 MigratieMuseumMigration, Brussels

Croatia
 Krapina Neanderthal Site, Krapina
 Vučedol Culture Museum, Vukovar

Czech Republic
 Olomouc Premyslid Castle and Archdiocesan Museum, Olomouc
 Kynžvart Castle – Place of diplomatic meetings
 Werkbund Estates in Europe - Osada Baba (Prague), Nový dům (Brno)

Estonia
 Great Guild Hall, Tallinn
 Historic Ensemble of the University of Tartu, Tartu

France
 Abbey of Cluny
 Robert Schuman's House, Scy-Chazelles 
 European District of Strasbourg
 Former Natzweiler-Struthof Concentration Camp
 Le Chambon-sur-Lignon Memorial

Germany

 Hambach Castle 
 Münster and Osnabrück – Sites of the Peace of Westphalia
 Leipzig’s Musical Heritage Sites
 Werkbund Estates in Europe - Weissenhof Estate (Stuttgart)

Greece
 The Heart of Ancient Athens

Hungary
 Liszt Ferenc Academy of Music, Budapest 
 Pan-European Picnic Memorial Park, Sopron
 Dohány Street Synagogue Complex
 Living Heritage of Szentendre

Italy
 Casa Alcide de Gasperi museum, Pieve Tesino
 Fort Cadine  Trentino
 Archaeological Area of Ostia Antica

Latvia

 Three Brothers, Riga

Lithuania

 Kaunas of 1919-1940

Luxembourg 
 Village of Schengen, birthplace of the Schengen Agreement

Netherlands
 Camp Westerbork 
 Peace Palace, The Hague
 The Maastricht Treaty
 Colonies of Benevolence

Poland

 Gdańsk Shipyard
 Constitution of May 3, 1791, Warsaw 
 Union of Lublin
 World War I Eastern Front Cemetery No. 123
 Site of Remembrance in Łambinowice
 Werkbund Estates in Europe - WUWA (Wroclaw)

Portugal
 Charter of the Law of Abolition of the Death Penalty (1867), Lisbon
 University of Coimbra General Library
 Sagres Point
 Underwater Cultural Heritage of the Azores

Romania 
 Sighet Memorial

Slovenia
 Franja Partisan Hospital
 Church of the Holy Spirit, Javorca
 Zdravljica - the Message of the European Spring of Nations

Spain
 Archive of the Crown of Aragon, Barcelona
 Residencia de Estudiantes, Madrid

The logo

The logo of the new European Heritage Label was selected following a competition held in 2012.

The Label itself is awarded as a large plaque bearing an inscription in the national language and in English and a small plaque with just the logo. All of the large plaques contain the common element: "It features on the European Union’s list of European Heritage sites because of the significant role it has played in the history and culture of Europe."

References

External links 
 Detailed information on the intergovernmental initiative, Website of the Spanish Ministry of Culture (Spanish)
 European Heritage Label, European Commission website 
 Decision No 1194/2011/EU of the European Parliament and of the Council of 16 November 2011 establishing a European Union action for the European Heritage Label 
 Video describing European Heritage Label 
 Map of the European heritage sites (multilingual) 

History of Europe
History awards
Heritage registers by country